Edward Keenan may refer to:

 Eddie Keenan, American football player
 Edward L. Keenan, American professor of history
 Edward A. Keenan, American politician, mayor of Burlington, Vermont